Artogne (Artògne in camunian dialect) is an Italian comune in the province of Brescia, in Lombardy (Italy).
 
Artogne lies on the left side of Oglio river, between the towns of Gianico, Pian Camuno and Rogno.

History

In 1233 Artogne became property of the Brusati family.

In 1331 Zanone called "Mastaio" and Ziliolo Federici, sons of Bojaco of Gorzone, bought all the property that Girardo Brusati owned in the land of Artogne.

Artogne is indicated on the 1508 map of Valle Camonica designed by Leonardo da Vinci, which is kept at the Royal Library of Windsor, in Great Britain.

In 1912 a severe flood hit the village.

In 1927 the town merged with that of Pian Camuno, creating the town of Pian d'Artogne. This was split again in 1957.

On July 26, 1944, Battista Pedersoli, Giacomo Marioli and Antonio Cotti Cottiniare were killed at the Cascina Campelli by nazi-fascists.

Main sights
 
The churches of Artogne are:
 Church of Santa Maria  Elisabetta (15th century): the portal dates from 1532.
 Church of Sant'Andrea, in 15th century style. The presbytery is separated from the nave by an iron grating.
 Parish of Saints Cornelius and Cyprian, the portal in "stone of Sarnico" contains the inscription "pietas polùpuli erexit years 1751/cornelio et cypria martiribus".

There are several houses of the Federici family, including one with a stone portal of Sarnico and studded wooden door of the 15th century.

Traditions and folklore
The scütüm are in camunian dialect nicknames, sometimes personal, elsewhere showing the characteristic features of a community.  The one which characterize the people of Artogne are Patàte, Mascherpine, maia mèlga, Màgole.

Sport
Sportspeople linked to Artogne include:
 Nadia Fanchini
 Elena Fanchini

Twin towns
Artogne is twinned with:

  Courcelles, Belgium, since 1999

References

Bibliography

External links

 Historical photos - Intercam
 Historical photos - Lombardia Beni Culturali

Cities and towns in Lombardy
Articles which contain graphical timelines